Platycaelus is a genus of beetles in the family Carabidae, containing the following species:

 Platycaelus archboldi Darlington, 1962
 Platycaelus biroi Darlington, 1962
 Platycaelus depressus Blanchard, 1843
 Platycaelus interstitialis (Sloane, 1910)
 Platycaelus jedlickai (Straneo, 1942)
 Platycaelus major (Straneo, 1942)
 Platycaelus melliei Montrouzier, 1860
 Platycaelus poeciloides (Chaudoir, 1878)
 Platycaelus prolixus Erichson, 1842

References

Pterostichinae